Ekin Bulut (born 27 September 1996) is a Swedish football striker who plays for Norrby.

Club career
He became top goalscorer of the 2019 Division 1.

In December 2021, Bulut signed with Norrby for the 2022 season.

Personal life
Born in Sweden, Bulut is of Turkish descent.

References

1996 births
Living people
Swedish footballers
Swedish people of Turkish descent
Association football forwards
Vasalunds IF players
Akropolis IF players
Nyköpings BIS players
IK Sirius Fotboll players
Norrby IF players
Ettan Fotboll players
Allsvenskan players
Superettan players